The Department of the Prime Minister and Cabinet (DPMC) is the central public service department of New Zealand charged with providing support and advice to the governor-general, the prime minister and members of the Cabinet of New Zealand.  The department is also charged with centrally leading New Zealand's "national security planning, which includes civil defence."

The department's overall area of responsibility is in helping to provide, at an administrative level, the "constitutional and institutional glue" within New Zealand's parliamentary democracy.

The department along with the State Services Commission, and the Treasury constitute the central agencies or public service departments leading the state sector of New Zealand.

Role
The department serves the Executive branch of government (the governor-general, the prime minister and the Cabinet) through the provision of impartial advice and support services.

In addition to serving the Executive, a major role of the department is to help co-ordinate the work of the core public service departments and ministries.

Supporting the prime minister and Cabinet
The department supports the prime minister's twin roles as leader of the government and chair of Cabinet, and provides three kinds of direct support to the prime minister:
 Support for constitutional issues, including those associated with the formation of governments; and issues associated with the operation of the Cabinet system.
 Overview of government activity and access to information on any and all issues that arise.
 Administrative support to the prime minister (and also to the governor-general). This includes services to the Prime Minister – such as preparing replies to Parliamentary questions, and dealing with Official Information Act 1982 requests and other correspondence.

Supporting the governor-general
The department also supports the governor-general of New Zealand in carrying out his or her functions to represent the King.

Structure
The department formally came into existence on 1 January 1990, as a result of a report which recommended establishing structures to provide two separate streams of advice to the prime minister; one, a new Government department to supply impartial advice and support to the prime minister and Cabinet (DPMC), and another, a Prime Minister's Private Office (which is not part of DPMC), to provide personal support and media services, and advice of a party political nature.

Government House was added to the department in August 1990. The National Assessments Bureau (formerly known as the External Assessments Bureau) became part of the department on 1 July 1991. Responsibility for civil defence and emergency management was consolidated in the department in 2014 through a business unit called the Ministry for Civil Defence and Emergency Management (MCDEM). MCDEM was superseded by an autonomous departmental agency hosted by DPMC in 2019, the National Emergency Management Agency (NEMA). 

The department is often responsible for coordinating government responses to significant events. It leads the All-of-Government Response to the COVID-19 pandemic in New Zealand and the Government response to the Royal Commission of Inquiry into the Terrorist Attack on the Christchurch Mosques. It previously led and coordinated central government's ongoing role in the recovery and regeneration of greater Christchurch following the earthquakes of 2010 and 2011. The department's Greater Christchurch Group operated from April 2016 until January 2021.

The department consists of nine business units.

Ministers 
The department serves 6 portfolios and 5 ministers.

Head of DPMC
Heads of the DPMC (formerly Secretary, now the Chief Executive) are:

See also
 Officials Committee for Domestic and External Security Co-ordination
 Department of the Prime Minister and Cabinet (Australia)

References

External links
 

New Zealand Public Service departments
New Zealand